Qareh Gowzlu may refer to:
 Qareh Gowzlu, East Azerbaijan
 Qareh Gowzlu, Fars
 Qareh Gowzlu, Zanjan
 Qareh Gowzlu, West Azerbaijan